Johannes Michaël "Jan" Meijer (8 June 1921 – 21 October 1993) was a Dutch sprinter. He competed at the 1948 Summer Olympics in the 100 m and 4 × 100 m events and finished in sixth place in the relay.

Competition record

References

1921 births
1993 deaths
Dutch male sprinters
Athletes (track and field) at the 1948 Summer Olympics
Olympic athletes of the Netherlands
Athletes from Amsterdam